Palestine participated in the 2004 Summer Paralympics in Athens, Greece. Palestine was represented by two athletes: Husam Azzam, who had won a bronze medal in the shot put in the previous Games, and Mohammed Fannouna, competing in the long jump and javelin events.

In Athens, Azzam won silver in the shot put, while Fannouna won bronze in the long jump.

List of medalists

Sports

Athletics

Men's field

See also
Palestine at the Paralympics
Palestine at the 2004 Summer Olympics

References

External links
International Paralympic Committee

Nations at the 2004 Summer Paralympics
2004
Para